1365 Henyey, provisional designation , is a stony Florian asteroid from the inner regions of the asteroid belt, approximately 11 kilometers in diameter. It was discovered by German astronomer Max Wolf at Heidelberg Observatory in southern Germany on 9 September 1928, and named for American astronomer Louis Henyey.

Orbit and classification 

Henyey is a member of the Flora family, a large population of stony S-type asteroids in the inner main-belt. It orbits the Sun in the inner main-belt at a distance of 2.0–2.5 AU once every 3 years and 4 months (1,232 days). Its orbit has an eccentricity of 0.12 and an inclination of 5° with respect to the ecliptic. The body's observation arc begins with its official discovery observation in 1928.

Physical characteristics

Rotation period 

In August 2012, a first rotational lightcurve of Henyey was obtained from photometric observations by Daniel Klinglesmith at Etscorn Campus Observatory in New Mexico. It gave a rotation period of 18.986 hours with a brightness variation of 0.23 magnitude. In November 2016, a divergent period solution of 32.2 hours with a change in brightness of 0.32 magnitude was found by French amateur astronomer René Roy.

Diameter and albedo 

According to the survey carried out by NASA's Wide-field Infrared Survey Explorer with its subsequent NEOWISE mission, Henyey measures 10.31 and 10.96 kilometers in diameter and its surface has an albedo of 0.26 and 0.28. respectively. The Collaborative Asteroid Lightcurve Link assumes an albedo of 0.24 – derived from 8 Flora, the largest member and namesake of the family – and calculates a diameter of 11.31 kilometers with an absolute magnitude of 11.9.

Naming 

Based on a suggestion by William Westbrooke, this minor planet was named after American astronomer Louis Henyey (1910–1970), known for his contributions in the field of stellar structure and stellar evolution. The lunar crater Henyey is also named in his honour. The official  was published by the Minor Planet Center on 20 February 1971.

Further reading

References

External links 
 Asteroid Lightcurve Database (LCDB), query form (info )
 Dictionary of Minor Planet Names, Google books
 Asteroids and comets rotation curves, CdR – Observatoire de Genève, Raoul Behrend
 Discovery Circumstances: Numbered Minor Planets (1)-(5000) – Minor Planet Center
 
 

001365
Discoveries by Max Wolf
Named minor planets
19280909